Kendrick Scott (born July 8, 1980 in Houston, Texas, United States) is an American jazz drummer, bandleader, and composer. He is the founder of the record label World Culture Music.

Biography
Kendrick A.D. Scott was born and raised in Houston. The first encounters Kendrick had with the drums were in church, where his parents, Kenneth and Stepheny, and older brother were involved in the music ministry. Scott was later accepted to Houston's famed High School for the Performing and Visual Arts (HSPVA) where his high school career culminated in many awards - the most notable being The Clifford Brown/Stan Getz Fellowship, given by the International Association for Jazz Education (IAJE) and The National Foundation for the Advancement of the Arts. Upon graduation from high school in 1998, Kendrick was awarded a scholarship to attend the famed Berklee College of Music in Boston, MA, majoring in Music Education. Since graduating from Berklee in 2002, Scott has performed with a variety of name artists including the Jazz Crusaders, guitarist Pat Metheny, saxophonists Joe Lovano and Kenny Garrett, vocalists Dianne Reeves, Lizz Wright, Gretchen Parlato and trumpeter Terence Blanchard, to name a few. He also was a member of the Berklee-Monterey Quartet, performing at the legendary Monterey Jazz Festival in 1999-2000, 2002 and 2007.

Scott’s debut recording with his group Oracle recorded The Source in 2006, including pianists Aaron Parks and Robert Glasper, guitarist Lionel Loueke, vocalist Gretchen Parlato, and others. Scott also performed with the Terence Blanchard Quintet on the album A Tale of God’s Will (A Requiem for Katrina) (2007), which was nominated for two Grammy Awards for 2008. Kendrick was a member of the band that accompanied Terence Blanchard to the Monterey Jazz Festival’s 50th anniversary in 2007, and Scott embarked on the 22-state tour, starting in January, 2008 with the 50th Anniversary MJF All-Star Band.  It featured the leaders of the past, present and future with Terence Blanchard on trumpet, James Moody on saxophone, Benny Green on piano, Derrick Hodge on bass, and jazz vocalist Nnenna Freelon.

Scott also currently plays with the Charles Lloyd Quartet, featuring alongside Reuben Rogers on bass, and Gerald Clayton on piano.

Selective discography

As leader

As group 
Blue Note All Stars
 Our Point of View (Blue Note, 2017)[2CD]

As sideman

References

External links
 KendrickScott official website
 World Culture Music
 Berklee College of Music: Kendrick Scott
 All About Jazz: Kendrick Scott: Oracle for Good Music

1980 births
Living people
Musicians from Houston
American jazz drummers
High School for the Performing and Visual Arts alumni
Jazz musicians from Texas
21st-century American drummers